Sommet Edelweiss is a ski area located in Wakefield, Quebec, 30 minutes north of Ottawa, Ontario, Canada, in the Gatineau Hills.

Description
Sommet Edelweiss is a ski resort located in Wakefield, Quebec, approximately 30 minutes north of Ottawa. It is family oriented and consists of mostly beginner and intermediate terrain. There is a snow tubing park that is popular for families and school field trips. Edelweiss Valley was acquired by Mont Saint-Sauveur International in 2000.
The ski area was started by three partners, Andy Tommy, who ran the ski area, and Art Tommy and Reg Lefebvre who ran the ski shop Tommy and Lefebvre. The early years brought many improvements such as snowmaking and night skiing, they were open daily from 8h30 am to 10 PM.

The Mountain manager was a colourful character Dick Gagne who worked there for almost 15 years until he retired.

Some famous ski racers came from Edelweiss, Mike Tommy, Michaela Tommy, Lizbeth Tommy, Mike Gagne, and many others

Improvements since 2000
Since Mont Saint-Sauveur International acquired Sommet Edelweiss, improvements have included: 
 two additional quad chairlifts have been installed. A Doppelmayr quad chairlift (to replace an old Yan double chair), and a Poma quad chairlift (to replace the old Poma double chair).
 a new beginner trail was created (Chemin des Bois) as an addition to the existing Easy Street trail,
 a snow tubing park was opened, serviced by a triple chair and magic carpet, 
 snowmaking efficiency and capacity were improved, and grooming.
 A Rockstar Energy Drink sponsored snowpark (MSS Rockstar SnoPrk)
For the 2021 season, Sommet Edelweiss introduced their newly expanded lodge addition which featured more indoor seating and storage areas.

See also
 MSSI-Mont Saint-Sauveur International
 List of ski areas and resorts in Canada

References

External links

Les Sommets

Ski areas and resorts in Quebec
Tourist attractions in Outaouais
Tourist attractions in Ottawa